Jacques Maclès (born 8 July 1945) is a French chess FIDE master (FM), French Chess Championship winner (1970) and Paris City Chess Championship winner (1975).

Biography
In 1965, in Barcelona, Jacques Maclès participated in the 8th World Junior Chess Championship and ranked 17th. He also participated in a number of international chess competitions held in the 1960s-1980s in France. Jacques Maclès won the French Chess Championship in 1970 and the Paris City Chess Championship in 1975.

Jacques Maclès played for France in the Chess Olympiad:
 In 1974, at the first board in the 21st Chess Olympiad in Nice (+6, =7, -4).

References

External links
 
 
 
 

1945 births
Living people
French chess players
Chess FIDE Masters
Chess Olympiad competitors